Aphelandra squarrosa, commonly (if not ambiguously) called "zebra plant", is a small- to medium-sized tropical shrub in the Acanthus family Acanthaceae. It is a part of the overall Atlantic Forest vegetation of eastern coastal Brazil. Aphelandra is often sold for use as a decorative house plant. This plant species is cited in Flora Brasiliensis by Carl Friedrich Philipp von Martius.

Plant care

This plant flourishes in abundant, but not direct, bright light. Reflected light is beneficial as well. It does not bloom often, but it can be encouraged to bloom by prolonged daily exposure to light. It is also very sensitive to moisture content - too much or too little water will cause the biggest leaves to wilt and fall off. It likes to be kept moist, but not wet. Drainage of the substrate is equally as important as moisture retention. On average, it needs frequent, small amounts of water, as opposed to an occasional, thorough watering. This makes A. squarrosa an ideal candidate for growing in hydroponic or semi-hydroponic setups; for example, in a substrate such as LECA (lightweight expanded clay aggregate, also known as hydroton), there will be reliably consistent moisture and nutrients available to the plant, with the porous LECA's capillary action delivering sufficiently to the roots.

The plant flourishes when the temperature is in the range of 18-21 °C (65-70 °F); and will suffer if the temperature drops below 15 °C (60 °F) for prolonged periods.

References

External links
Michigan State University Extension: Aphelandra squarrosa
 Flora Brasiliensis: Aphelandra squarrosa

squarrosa
Endemic flora of Brazil
Flora of the Atlantic Forest
House plants